The European bison (Bison bonasus) or the European wood bison, also known as the wisent ( or ), the zubr, or sometimes colloquially as the European buffalo, is a European species of bison. It is one of two extant species of bison, alongside the American bison. The European bison is the heaviest wild land animal in Europe, and individuals in the past may have been even larger than their modern-day descendants. During late antiquity and the Middle Ages, bison became extinct in much of Europe and Asia, surviving into the 20th century only in northern-central Europe and the northern Caucasus Mountains. During the early years of the 20th century, bison were hunted to extinction in the wild.

The species — now numbering several thousand and returned to the wild by captive breeding programmes — is no longer in immediate danger of extinction, but remains absent from most of its historical range. It is not to be confused with the aurochs (Bos primigenius), the extinct ancestor of domestic cattle, with which it once co-existed.

Besides humans, bison have few predators. In the 19th century, there were scattered reports of wolves,  lions,  tigers, and 
bears hunting bison. In the past, especially during the Middle Ages, humans commonly killed bison for their hide and meat. They used their horns to make  drinking horns. 

European bison were hunted to extinction in the wild in the early 20th century, with the last wild animals of the B. b. bonasus subspecies being shot in the Białowieża Forest (on today's Belarus–Poland border) in 1921. The last of the Caucasian wisent subspecies (B. b. caucasicus) was shot in the northwestern Caucasus in 1927. The Carpathian wisent (B. b. hungarorum) had been hunted to extinction by 1852. 

The Białowieża or lowland European bison was kept alive in captivity, and has since been reintroduced into several countries in Europe. In 1996, the International Union for Conservation of Nature classified the European bison as an endangered species, no longer extinct in the wild. Its status has improved since then, changing to vulnerable and later to near-threatened.

European bison were first scientifically described by Carl Linnaeus in 1758. Some later descriptions treat the European bison as conspecific with the American bison. Three subspecies of the European bison existed in the recent past, but only one, the nominate subspecies (B. b. bonasus), survives today. The ancestry and relationships of the wisent to fossil bison species remain controversial and disputed.

The European bison is one of the national animals of Poland and Belarus.

Etymology
He also noted that the Paeonians called it μόναπος (monapos). Both Martial and Seneca the Younger mention  (. ).

John Trevisa is the earliest author cited by the Oxford English Dictionary as using, in his 1398 translation of Bartholomeus Anglicus's De proprietatibus rerum, the Latin plural  in English, as "bysontes" ( and ). Philemon Holland's 1601 translation of Pliny's Natural History, referred to "bisontes". The marginalia of the King James Version gives "bison" as a gloss for the Biblical animal called the "pygarg" mentioned in the Book of Deuteronomy. Randle Cotgrave's 1611 French–English dictionary notes that  was already in use, and it may have influenced the adoption of the word into English, or alternatively it may have been borrowed direct from Latin. John Minsheu's 1617 lexicon, Ductor in linguas, gives a definition for Bíson.

In the 18th century the name of the European animal was applied to the closely related American bison (initially in Latin in 1693, by John Ray) and the Indian bison (the gaur, Bos gaurus). Historically the word was also applied to Indian domestic cattle, the zebu (B. indicus or B. primigenius indicus). Because of the scarcity of the European bison the word ‘bison’ was most familiar in relation to the American species.

The , also found in weasel, originally referred to the animal's musk.

The noun for the European bison in all living Slavonic tongues is thought to be derived from Proto-Slavic: *zǫbrъ ~ *izǫbrъ, which itself possibly comes from Proto-Indo-European: *ǵómbʰ- for tooth, horn or peg.

Description

The European bison is the heaviest surviving wild land animal in Europe.

On average, it is lighter in body mass, and yet slightly taller at the shoulder, than its American relatives, the wood bison (Bison bison athabascae) and the plains bison (Bison bison bison). Compared to the American species, the wisent has shorter hair on the neck, head, and forequarters, but longer tail and horns. See differences from American bison.

The European bison makes a variety of vocalisations depending on its mood and behaviour, but when anxious, it emits a growl-like sound, known in Polish as chruczenie. This sound can also be heard from wisent males during the mating season.

History

Prehistory

Historically, the lowland European bison's range encompassed most of the lowlands of northern Europe, extending from the Massif Central to the Volga River and the Caucasus. It may have once lived in the Asiatic part of what is now the Russian Federation, reaching to Lake Baikal and Altai Mountains in east. The European bison is known in southern Sweden only between 9500 and 8700 BP, and in Denmark similarly is documented only from the Pre-Boreal. It is not recorded from the British Isles, nor from Italy or the Iberian Peninsula, although prehistorical absence of the species among British Isles is debatable; bison fossils of unclarified species have been found on Doggerland or Brown Bank, and Isle of Wight and Oxfordshire, followed by fossil records of Pleistocene woodland bison and Steppe bison from the isles. The extinct Steppe bison (B. priscus) is known from across Eurasia and North America, last occurring 7,000 BC to 5,400 BC, and is depicted in the Cave of Altamira and Lascaux. The Pleistocene woodland bison (B. schoetensacki), has been proposed to have last existed around 36,000 BC. But other authors restrict B. schoetensacki to remains that are hundreds of thousands of years older. Cave paintings appear to distinguish between B. bonasus and B. priscus.

Antiquity and Middle Ages
Within mainland Europe, its range decreased as human populations expanded and cut down forests. They seemed to be common in Aristotle's period on Mount Mesapion (possibly the modern Ograzhden). In the same wider area Pausanias calling them Paeonian bulls and bisons, gives details on how they were captured alive; adding also the fact that a golden Paeonian bull head was offered to Delphi by the Paeonian king Dropion (3rd century BC) who lived in what is today Tikveš. The last references (Oppian, Claudius Aelianus) to the animal in the transitional Mediterranean/Continental biogeographical region in the Balkans in the area of modern borderline between Greece, North Macedonia and Bulgaria date to the 3rd century AD. In northern Bulgaria, the wisent survived until the 9th or 10th century AD. There is a possibility that the species' range extended to East Thrace during the 7th – 8th century AD. Its population in Gaul was extinct in the 8th century AD. The species survived in the Ardennes and the Vosges Mountains until the 15th century. In the Early Middle Ages, the wisent apparently still occurred in the forest steppes east of the Urals, in the Altai Mountains, and seems to have reached Lake Baikal in the east. The northern boundary in the Holocene was probably around 60°N in Finland. European bison survived in a few natural forests in Europe, but their numbers dwindled.

Early Modern period

In 1513 the Białowieża Forest, at this point one of the last areas on Earth where the European bison still roamed free, was transferred from the Troki Voivodeship of Lithuania to the Podlaskie Voivodeship, which after the Union of Lublin became part of the Polish Crown. In the Polish–Lithuanian Commonwealth, at first European bison in the Białowieża Forest were legally the property of the Grand Dukes of Lithuania and later belonged to the Crown of the Kingdom of Poland. Polish-Lithuanian rulers took measures to protect the European bison, such as King Sigismund II Augustus who instituted the death penalty for poaching bison in Białowieża in the mid-16th century. Wild European bison herds existed in the forest until the mid-17th century. In 1701, King Augustus II the Strong greatly increased protection over the forest; the first written sources mentioning the use of some forest meadows for the production of winter fodder for the bison come from this period. In the early 19th century, after the partitions of the Polish Commonwealth, the Russian tsars retained old Polish-Lithuanian laws protecting the European bison herd in Białowieża but also turned all the people inhabiting the area into serfs. Despite these measures and others, the European bison population continued to decline over the following century, with only Białowieża and Northern Caucasus populations surviving into the 20th century. The last European bison in Transylvania died in 1790.

Early 20th century
During World War I, occupying German troops killed 600 of the European bison in the Białowieża Forest for sport, meat, hides and horns. A German scientist informed army officers that the European bison were facing imminent extinction, but at the very end of the war, retreating German soldiers shot all but nine animals. The last wild European bison in Poland was killed in 1921. The last wild European bison in the world was killed by poachers in 1927 in the western Caucasus. By that year, 48 remained, all held by zoos. The International Society for the Preservation of the Wisent was founded on 25 and 26 August 1923 in Berlin, following the example of the American Bison Society. The first chairman was Kurt Priemel, director of the Frankfurt Zoo, and among the members were experts like Hermann Pohle, Max Hilzheimer and Julius Riemer. The first goal of the society was to take stock of all living bison, in preparation for a breeding programme. Important members were the Polish Hunting Association and the Poznań zoological gardens, as well as a number of Polish private individuals, who provided funds to acquire the first bison cows and bulls. The breeding book was published in the company's annual report from 1932. While Priemel aimed to grow the population slowly with pure conservation of the breeding line, Lutz Heck planned to grow the population faster by cross-breeding with American bison in a separate breeding project in Munich, in 1934.

World War II
Heck gained the support of then Reichsjägermeister Hermann Göring, who hoped for huntable big game. Heck promised his powerful supporter in writing: "Since surplus bulls will soon be set, the hunting of the Wisent will be possible again in the foreseeable future". Göring himself took over the patronage of the German Professional Association of Wisent Breeders and Hegers, founded at Heck's suggestion. Kurt Priemel, who had since resigned as president of the International Society for the Preservation of the Wisent, warned in vain against "manification". Heck answered by announcing that Göring would take action against Priemel if he continued to oppose his crossing plans. Priemel was then banned from publishing in relation to bison breeding, and the regular bookkeeper of the International Society, Erna Mohr, was forced to hand over the official register in 1937. Thus, the older society was effectively incorporated into the newly created Professional Association. After the Second World War, therefore, only the pure-blooded bison in the game park Springe near Hanover were recognised as part of the international herd book.

1950s onwards

The first two bison were released into the wild in the Białowieża Forest in 1929. By 1964 more than 100 existed. Over the following decades, thanks to Polish and international efforts, the Białowieża Forest regained its position as the location with the world's largest population of European bison, including those in the wild. In 2005-2007, a wild bison nicknamed Pubal became renowned in southeast Poland due to his friendly interactions with humans and unwillingness to reintegrate into the wild. As of 2014 there were 1,434 wisents in Poland, out of which 1,212 were in free-range herds and 522 belonged to the wild population in the Białowieża Forest. Compared to 2013, the total population in 2014 increased by 4.1%, while the free-ranging population increased by 6.5%. Bison from Poland have also been transported beyond the country's borders to boost the local populations of other countries, among them Bulgaria, Spain, Romania, Czechia and others. Poland has been described as the world's breeding centre of the European bison, where the bison population doubled between 1995 and 2017, reaching 2,269 by the end of 2019 – the total population has been increasing by around 15% to 18% yearly. In July 2022 a small population was released into woodland in Kent to trial their reintroduction into the UK.

Genetic history

A 2003 study of mitochondrial DNA indicated four distinct maternal lineages in the tribe Bovini:
Taurine cattle and zebu
Wisent
American bison and yak
Banteng, gaur, and gayal

Y chromosome analysis associated wisent and American bison. An earlier study, using amplified fragment-length polymorphism fingerprinting, showed a close association of wisent and American bison and probably with yak. It noted the interbreeding of Bovini species made determining relationships problematic.

European bison can crossbreed with American bison. This hybrid is known in Poland as a żubrobizon. The products of a German interbreeding programme were destroyed after the Second World War. This programme was related to the impulse which created the Heck cattle. The cross-bred individuals created at other zoos were eliminated from breed books by the 1950s. A Russian back-breeding programme resulted in a wild herd of hybrid animals, which presently lives in the Caucasian Biosphere Reserve (550 animals in 1999).

Wisent-cattle hybrids also occur, similarly to the North American beefalo. Cattle and European bison hybridise fairly readily. First-generation males are infertile. In 1847, a herd of wisent-cattle hybrids named żubroń was created by Leopold Walicki. The animals were intended to become durable and cheap alternatives to cattle. The experiment was continued by researchers from the Polish Academy of Sciences until the late 1980s. Although the program resulted in a quite successful animal that was both hardy and could be bred in marginal grazing lands, it was eventually discontinued. Currently, the only surviving żubroń herd consists of just a few animals in Białowieża Forest, Poland and Belarus.

In 2016, the first whole genome sequencing data from two European bison bulls from the Białowieża Forest revealed that the bison and bovine species diverged from about 1.7 to 0.85 Mya, through a speciation process involving limited gene flow. These data further support the occurrence of more recent secondary contacts, posterior to the divergence between Bos primigenius primigenius and B. p. namadicus (ca. 150,000 years ago), between the wisent and (European) taurine cattle lineages. An independent study of mitochondrial DNA and autosomal markers confirmed these secondary contacts (with an estimate of up to 10% of bovine ancestry in the modern wisent genome) leading the authors to go further in their conclusions by proposing the wisent to be a hybrid between steppe bison and aurochs with a hybridisation event originating before 120,000 years ago. However, other studies considered the 10% estimate for aurochs gene flow a gross overstimate and based on flawed data, and not supported by the data from the full nuclear genome of the wisent.

Some of the authors however support the hypothesis that similarity of wisent and cattle (Bos) mitochondrial genomes is result of incomplete lineage sorting during divergence of Bos and Bison from their common ancestors rather than further post-speciation gene flow (ancient hybridisation between Bos and Bison). But they agree that limited gene flow from Bos primigenius taurus could account for the affiliation between wisent and cattle nuclear genomes (in contrast to mitochondrial ones).

Alternatively, genome sequencing completed on remains attributed to the Pleistocene woodland bison (B. schoetensacki), and published in 2017, posited that genetic similarities between the Pleistocene woodland bison and the wisent suggest that B. schoetensaki was the ancestor of the European wisent.  However, other studies have disputed the attribution of the remains to this species, otherwise known from remains hundreds of thousands of years older, instead referring them to an unnamed lineage of bison closely related to B. bonasius. A 2018 study proposed that the lineage leading to the wisent and to the lineage ancestral to both the American bison and Bison priscus had split over 1 million years ago, with the mitochondrial DNA discrepancy being the result of incomplete lineage sorting. The authors also proposed that during the late Middle Pleistocene there had been interbreeding between the ancestor of the wisent and the common ancestor of Bison priscus and the American bison.

Behaviour and biology

Social structure and territorial behaviours

The European bison is a herd animal, which lives in both mixed and solely male groups. Mixed groups consist of adult females, calves, young aged 2–3 years, and young adult bulls. The average herd size is dependent on environmental factors, though on average, they number eight to 13 animals per herd. Herds consisting solely of bulls are smaller than mixed ones, containing two individuals on average. European bison herds are not family units. Different herds frequently interact, combine, and quickly split after exchanging individuals.

Bison social structure has been described by specialists as a matriarchy, as it is the cows of the herd that lead it, and decide where the entire group moves to graze. Although larger and heavier than the females, the oldest and most powerful male bulls are usually satellites that hang around the edges of the herd to protect the group. Bulls begin to serve a more active role in the herd when a danger to the group's safety appears, as well as during the mating season – when they compete with each other.

Territory held by bulls is correlated by age, with young bulls aged between five and six tending to form larger home ranges than older males. The European bison does not defend territory, and herd ranges tend to greatly overlap. Core areas of territory are usually sited near meadows and water sources.

Reproduction
The rutting season occurs from August through to October. Bulls aged 4–6 years, though sexually mature, are prevented from mating by older bulls. Cows usually have a gestation period of 264 days, and typically give birth to one calf at a time.

On average, male calves weigh  at birth, and females . Body size in males increases proportionately to the age of 6 years. While females have a higher increase in body mass in their first year, their growth rate is comparatively slower than that of males by the age of 3–5. Bulls reach sexual maturity at the age of two, while cows do so in their third year.

European bison have lived as long as 30 years in captivity, but in the wild their lifespans are shorter. The lifespan of a bison in the wild is usually between 18 and 24 years, though females live longer than males. Productive breeding years are between four and 20 years of age in females, and only between six and 12 years of age in males.

Diet
European bison feed predominantly on grasses, although they also browse on shoots and leaves; in summer, an adult male can consume 32 kg of food in a day. European bison in the Białowieża Forest in Poland have traditionally been fed hay in the winter for centuries, and large herds may gather around this diet supplement. European bison need to drink every day, and in winter can be seen breaking ice with their heavy hooves.

Differences from American bison

Although superficially similar, a number of physical and behavioural differences are seen between the European bison and the American bison. The bison has 14 pairs of ribs, while the American bison has 15. 

Adult European bison are (on average) taller than American bison, and have longer legs. European bison tend to browse more, and graze less than their American relatives, due to their necks being set differently. Compared to the American bison, the nose of the European bison is set further forward than the forehead when the neck is in a neutral position.

The body of the wisent is less hairy, though its tail is hairier than that of the American species. The horns of the European bison point forward through the plane of their faces, making them more adept at fighting through the interlocking of horns in the same manner as domestic cattle, unlike the American bison, which favours charging. European bison are less tameable than the American ones, and breed with domestic cattle less readily.

The European bison is less shaggy, with a more lanky body shape.

In terms of behavioural capability, European bison runs slower and with less stamina yet jumps higher and longer than American bisons, showing signs of more developed adaptations into mountainous habitats.

Conservation

The protection of the European bison has a long history; between the 15th and 18th centuries, those in the forest of Białowieża were protected and their diet supplemented. Efforts to restore this species to the wild began in 1929, with the establishment of the Bison Restitution Centre at Białowieża, Poland. Subsequently, in 1948, the Bison Breeding Centre was established within the Prioksko-Terrasny Biosphere Reserve.

The modern herds are managed as two separate lines – one consisting of only Bison bonasus bonasus (all descended from only seven animals) and one consisting of all 12 ancestors, including the one B. b. caucasicus bull. The latter is generally not considered a separate subspecies because they contain DNA from both B. b. bonasus and B. b. caucasicius, although some scientists classify them as a new subspecies, B. b. montanus. Only a limited amount of inbreeding depression from the population bottleneck has been found, having a small effect on skeletal growth in cows and a small rise in calf mortality. Genetic variability continues to shrink. From five initial bulls, all current European bison bulls have one of only two remaining Y chromosomes.

Reintroduction

Beginning in 1951, European bison have been reintroduced into the wild, including some areas where they were never found wild. Free-ranging herds are currently found in Poland, Lithuania, Belarus, Ukraine, Bulgaria, Romania, Russia, Slovakia, Latvia, Switzerland, Kyrgyzstan, Germany, and in forest preserves in the Western Caucasus. The Białowieża Primeval Forest, an ancient woodland that straddles the border between Poland and Belarus, continues to have the largest free-living European bison population in the world with around 1000 wild bison counted in 2014. Herds have also been introduced in Moldova (2005), Spain (2010), Denmark (2012), and the Czech Republic (2014). 

The Wilder Blean project, headed up by the Wildwood Trust and Kent Wildlife Trust, introduced European bison to the UK for the first time in 6000 years (although there was an unsuccessful attempt in Scotland in 2011, and the European bison is not confirmed to be native to England while the British Isles once used to be inhabited by now-extinct Steppe bison and Pleistocene woodland bison). The herd of 3 females, with plans to also release a male in the following months, was set free in July 2022 within a 2,500-acre conservation area in West Blean and Thornden Woods, near Canterbury. Unknown to the rangers, one of the females was pregnant and gave birth to a calf in October 2022, marking the first wild bison born in the UK for the first time in millennia. 

As below-mentioned, there are established herds in Spain and Italy, however European bison has not been recorded naturally from the Iberian and Italian Peninsulas, while these regions were once inhabited by Pleistocene woodland bison and Steppe bison.

Numbers and distribution

Numbers by country
The total worldwide population recorded in 2019 was around 7,500 – about half of this number being in Poland and Belarus, with over 25% of the global population based in Poland alone. For 2016, the number was 6,573 (including 4,472 free-ranging) and has been increasing. Some local populations are estimated as:
: 10 animals
: 29 animals in 2021.
: 1,962 animals in 2019.
: Around 150 animals in northeastern Bulgaria; a smaller population has been reintroduced in the eastern Rhodope Mountains.
: 106 animals in 2017.
: Two herds were established in the summer of 2012, as part of conservation of the species. First, fourteen animals were released in meadows near the town of Randers, and later, seven animals on Bornholm. In June 2012, one male and six females were moved from Poland to the Danish island Bornholm. The plan was to examine if it is possible to establish a wild population of bison on the island over a five-year period. In 2018, it was decided to keep the bison on Bornholm, but maintained within the large fenced-in part of the Almindingen forest where originally introduced. In 2019, the bison that initially had been introduced near Randers were moved to the more suitable and spacious Lille Vildmose; these were supplemented by seven animals from the Netherlands in 2021.
: One herd was established in 2005 in the Alps near the village of Thorenc (close to the city of Grasse), as part of conservation of the species. In 2015, it contained around 50 animals.
: A herd of 8 animals (1 male, 5 females, and 2 calves) was released into nature in April 2013 at the Rothaarsteig natural reserve near Bad Berleburg (North Rhine-Westphalia) after 850 years of absence since the species became extinct in that region. As of May 2015, 13 free-roaming wisents lived there. In September 2017 one of the free-living Polish animals swam the border river Oder and migrated to Germany. It was the first wild bison seen in Germany for more than 250 years. German authorities ordered the animal to be killed and it was shot dead by hunters in September 2017. As of 2020, the population has steadily increased to 26 individuals, living in one subpopulation.
: 11 animals in the Őrség National Park and few more in the Körös-Maros National Park.
: A small herd can be found in the Natura Viva Park near Verona, Italy, where the animals are protected and are prepared to be put in nature again in the wild areas of Romania.
: Animals were reintroduced at one point.
: Animals were reintroduced in Pape Nature Reserve in 2007.
: 214 free-ranging animals as of 2017.
: Extirpated from Moldova since the 18th century, wisents were reintroduced with the arrival of three European bison from Białowieża Forest in Poland several days before Moldova's Independence Day on 27 August 2005. Moldova is currently interested in expanding their wisent population, and began talks with Belarus in 2019 regarding a bison exchange program between the two countries. Bisons can be found in Pădurea Domnească.

: Natuurpark Lelystad: In 1976, the first Wisent arrived from Białowieża. Natuurpark Lelystad is a breeding centre with a herd of approx. 25 animals living together with Przewalski horses. All Wisents are registered in the European Studbook and are of the Lowland line. It is one of the suppliers for re-introduction projects in Europe. Kraansvlak herd established in 2007 with three wisents, and expanded to six in 2008; the Maashorst herd established in 2016 with 11 wisents; and the Veluwe herd established in 2016 with a small herd. In 2020 a new herd of 14 bison was established in the Slikken van de Heen. Numbers at the end of 2017 were: Lelystad 24, Kraansvlak 22, Maashorst 15 and the Veluwe 5, for a total of 66 animals.
: By the end of 2019 the number was 2,269, of which 2,048 were free-roaming and 221 were living in captivity, including zoos. A total of 770 belonged to the wild population in the Białowieża Forest and 668 to Bieszczady National Park. The total population has been increasing by around 15% to 18% yearly. Between 1995 and 2017 the number of bison in Poland doubled; from 2012 to 2017 it rose by 30%. Poland has been described as the world's breeding centre of the European bison. Zubr from Poland have also been transported beyond the country's borders to boost the local populations of other countries – among them Bulgaria, Czechia, Denmark, Moldova, Romania, Spain, Switzerland, and others. As the number of animals is growing, more bison are spotted in areas where they have not been seen in centuries, especially migrating males in Spring. The placement of about 40 free-roaming bison in the Lasy Janowskie in 2020/2021 resulted in ecologists' efforts to redesign some bridges of the S19 highway (constructed in 2020-2022) to allow large animals to cross it.
: The wisents were reintroduced in 1958, when the first two animals were brought from Poland and kept in a reserve in Hațeg. Similar locations later appeared in Vama Buzăului (Valea Zimbrilor Nature Reserve) and Bucșani, Dâmbovița. The idea of free bison, on the Romanian territory, was born in 1999, through a program supported by the World Bank and the European Union. Almost 100 free-roaming animals, as of 2019, population slowly increasing in the three areas where wild bison can be found: Northern Romania – Vânători-Neamț Natural Park, and South-West Romania – Țarcu Mountains and Poiana Ruscă Mountains, as part of the Life-Bison project initiated by WWF Romania and Rewilding Europe, with co-funding from the EU through its LIFE Programme.
: As of 2020, the population of Wisents in Russia has greatly recovered and stands at 1,588 individuals.
: In March 2022, 5 animals (one bull and four cows) were reintroduced where bison went extinct c.1800. Animals were transported from the Białowieża Forest and reintroduced on the Fruška Gora mountain.
: A bison reserve was established in Topoľčianky in 1958. The reserve has a maximum capacity of 13 animals but has bred around 180 animals for various zoos. As of 2020, there was also a wild breeding herd of 48 animals in Poloniny National Park with an increasing population.
: Two herds in northern Spain were established in 2010. As of 2018, the total population neared a hundred animals, half of them in Castile and León, but also in Asturias, Valencia, Extremadura and the Pyrenees.
: There are approximately 139 animals.
: More than 50 animals. Coming from Poland, one male and four females were introduced in November 2019 into the natural reserve and forest of Suchy, Vaud Canton, western Switzerland. On 15 June 2020, the first baby of that population was born. Besides the Suchy breeding station, several zoos in Switzerland are keeping bison too. From September 2022, at least five animals will be kept in semi-freedom in Welschenrohr, with hiking paths cutting through the enclosure.
: A population of around 240 animals, population is unstable and decreasing.
: In 2011, 3 animals were introduced into Alladale Wilderness Reserve in Scotland. Plans to move more into the reserve were made, but the project failed due to not being "well thought through", and the project was terminated in 2013. 11 years later, 3 female bison were introduced to the West Blean and Thornden Woods in Kent, England on 18 July 2022. A calf, also female, was unexpectedly born in September 2022, bringing the total number to 4. On 24 December 2022 a bull was introduced after delays brought about by Brexit-related complications. This makes these 5 bison the first "complete" wild herd in the UK in thousands of years.

Distribution

The largest European bison herds — of both captive and wild populations — are still based in Poland and Belarus, the majority of which can be found in the Białowieża Forest including the most numerous population of free-living European bison in the world with most of the animals living on the Polish side of the border. Poland remains the world's breeding centre for the wisent. In the years 1945 to 2014, from the Białowieża National Park alone, 553 specimens were sent to most captive populations of the bison in Europe as well as all breeding sanctuaries for the species in Poland.

Since 1983, a small reintroduced population lives in the Altai Mountains. This population suffers from inbreeding depression and needs the introduction of unrelated animals for "blood refreshment". In the long term, authorities hope to establish a population of about 1,000 animals in the area. One of the northernmost current populations of the European bison lives in Vologodskaya Oblast in the Northern Dvina valley at about 60°N. It survives without supplementary winter feeding. Another Russian population lives in the forests around the Desna River on the border between Russia and Ukraine. The north-easternmost population lives in Pleistocene Park south of Chersky in Siberia, a project to recreate the steppe ecosystem which began to be altered 10,000 years ago. Five wisents were introduced on 24 April 2011. The wisents were brought to the park from the Prioksko-Terrasny Nature Reserve near Moscow. Winter temperatures often drop below −50 °C. Four of the five bison have subsequently died due to problems acclimatizing to the low winter temperature.

Plans are being made to reintroduce two herds in Germany and in the Netherlands in Oostvaardersplassen Nature Reserve in Flevoland as well as the Veluwe. In 2007, a bison pilot project in a fenced area was begun in Zuid-Kennemerland National Park in the Netherlands. Because of their limited genetic pool, they are considered highly vulnerable to illnesses such as foot-and-mouth disease. In March 2016, a herd was released in the Maashorst Nature Reserve in North Brabant. Zoos in 30 countries also have quite a few bison involved in captive-breeding programs.

Cultural significance

Representations of the European bison from different ages, across millennia of human society's existence, can be found throughout Eurasia in the form of drawings and rock carvings; one of the oldest and most famous instances of the latter can be found in the Cave of Altamira, present-day Spain, where cave art featuring the wisent from the Upper Paleolithic was discovered. The bison has also been represented in a wide range of art in human history, such as sculptures, paintings, photographs, glass art, and more. Sculptures of the wisent constructed in the 19th and 20th centuries continue to stand in a number of European cities; arguably the most notable of these are the zubr statue in Spała from 1862 designed by Mihály Zichy and the two bison sculptures in Kiel sculpted by August Gaul in 1910–1913. However, a number of other monuments to the animal also exist, such as those in Hajnówka and Pszczyna or at the Kyiv Zoo entrance. Mikołaj Hussowczyk, a poet writing in Latin about the Grand Duchy of Lithuania during the early 16th century, described the bison in a historically significant fictional work from 1523.

The European bison is considered one of the national animals of Poland and Belarus. Due to this and the fact that half of the worldwide European bison population can be found spread across these two countries, the wisent is still featured prominently in the heraldry of these neighbouring states (especially in the overlapping region of Eastern Poland and Western Belarus). Examples in Poland include the coats of arms of: the counties of Hajnówka and Zambrów, the towns Sokółka and Żywiec, the villages Białowieża and Narewka, as well as the coats of arms of the Pomian and Wieniawa families. Examples in Belarus include the Grodno and Brest voblasts, the town of Svislach, and others. The European bison can also be found on the coats of arms of places in neighbouring countries: Perloja in southern Lithuania, Lypovets in west-central Ukraine, and Zubří in east Czechia – as well as further outside the region, such as Kortezubi in the Basque Country, and Jabel in Germany.

A flavoured vodka called Żubrówka, originating as a recipe of the szlachta of the Kingdom of Poland in the 14th century, has since 1928 been industrially produced as a brand in Poland. In the decades that followed, it became known as the "world's best known Polish vodka" and sparked the creation of a number of copy brands inspired by the original in Belarus, Russia, Germany, as well as other brands in Poland. The original Polish brand is known for placing a decorative blade of bison grass from the Białowieża Forest in each bottle of their product; both the plant's name in Polish and the vodka are named after żubr, the Polish name for the European bison. The bison also appears commercially as a symbol of a number of other Polish brands, such as the popular beer brand Żubr and on the logo of Poland's second largest bank, Bank Pekao S.A.

See also

Białowieża National Park

Notes

References

External links

Bison entry  from Walker's Mammals of the World
The Extinction Website – Caucasian European bison (Bison bonasus caucasicus).
The Extinction Website – Carpathian European bison (Bison bonasus hungarorum).
European bison/wisent
BBC NEWS Reversal fortunes
I. Parnikoza, V. Boreiko, V. Sesin, M. Kaliuzhna History, current state and perspectives of conservation of European bison in Ukraine // European Bison Conservation Newsletter Vol 2 (2009) pp: 5–16 
Species fact sheet on LHNet database
"Wisent online" from Browsk Forest District in Białowieża National Park, Poland
National Geographic – Rewilding Europe Brings Back the Continent's Largest Land Animal
European Bison Conservation Center
Rewilding bison in Romania
 Distribution and quantity of the European bison in 2014  (PDF; 213 kB)

Bison
Mammals of Europe
Near threatened animals
Near threatened biota of Europe
Mammals described in 1758
Taxa named by Carl Linnaeus